The BYEMAN Control System, or simply BYEMAN (designated BYE, or B), was a security control system put in place to protect information about the National Reconnaissance Office and its operations.

History
The BYEMAN Control System was put in place in 1961 by the Central Intelligence Agency.

Discussions regarding BCS retirement were held as early as 2003. NRO Director Peter B. Teets spoke at a 2003 NRO Town Hall meeting, mentioning that retiring the BCS would remove barriers that prevented the NRO and U.S. Intelligence Community from working together as a team.

The use of BCS was so prevalent throughout the U.S. Intelligence Community, that a handful of websites were set up to direct users through the retirement process.

Origin of name
An individual inside the CIA's Special Security Center chose the name from a random list of four words drawn from the CIA's codeword file. A byeman is a man who works underground; it is unknown if the individual knew the word's meaning before its selection.

Programs within BYEMAN
This is a small list of the publicly acknowledged programs that were held within the BCS:
CORONA (declassified 1995)
ARGON (declassified 1995)
LANYARD (declassified 1995)
GAMBIT (declassified 2011)
HEXAGON (declassified 2011)
GRAB (declassified 1998)
POPPY (declassified 2004)
QUILL (declassified 2012)
DORIAN (partial declassification 2012)
MELVIN (declassified 2011)
UPWARD (declassified 2012)

While many other NRO programs resided within the BCS, their codenames have not been made public through proper disclosure or official declassification.

Retirement
By order of the Director of Central Intelligence (DCI), BYEMAN was retired on 20 May 2005. Most information held within the BCS was transitioned into the Talent Keyhole Control System.

In popular culture
In the 1998 blockbuster movie Armageddon, a misspelling of the word, (i.e. "BYMAN") is used on a cover sheet protecting photos of the incoming asteroid. (the correct spelling, BYEMAN, was still classified "Confidential" at that time.)

References

National Reconnaissance Office
Classified information in the United States